This article lists the election results and representation of the UK Independence Party (UKIP) with respect to the House of Commons of the United Kingdom, Scottish Parliament, Senedd (Welsh Parliament), Northern Ireland Assembly, London Assembly, European Parliament and local authorities.

For results of elections contested by the Anti-Federalist League, UKIP's predecessor, see Anti-Federalist League election results.

House of Commons elections
UKIP has no Members of Parliament in the House of Commons. The party first had representation for a period in 2008 when Dr Bob Spink, the MP for Castle Point, resigned from the Conservative Party and joined UKIP on 21 April 2008. However, by November 2008, Spink had left UKIP, and in any case subsequently lost his seat to the Conservatives in the 2010 general election.

Douglas Carswell, the MP for Clacton, and Mark Reckless, the MP for Rochester and Strood, resigned from the Conservative Party to join UKIP on 28 August and 27 September 2014, respectively, and resigned their seats shortly thereafter. Carswell and Reckless won subsequent by-elections held on 9 October and 20 November 2014. Carswell was re-elected at the 2015 general election, but Reckless was not, the seat being re-taken by the Conservatives. Carswell thus became the only person so far to win a seat for UKIP in a general election, but left UKIP to sit as an independent MP on 25 March 2017. On 6 April 2017, Reckless—by now sitting in the Welsh Assembly, having been elected there in 2016—also left UKIP to sit with the Conservative group in the Assembly, although he had not yet officially rejoined his old party.

General elections

By-elections
Below are UKIP's results for the Westminster by-elections in which it competed for each period.

1992–97

Source:

1997–2001

Source:

2001–05

Source:

2005–10

Source:

2010–15

Source:

2015–17

2017–19

2019–

European Parliament elections

Source:

Scottish Parliament elections

General elections

Source:

By-elections

2000–present

Source:

Welsh Assembly/Senedd elections

UKIP had seven members elected to the Welsh Assembly at the 2016 election. Following multiple defections, there was only one UKIP Assembly member (now Member of the Senedd, MS) by the time of the 2021 Senedd election:
 Neil Hamilton

Nathan Gill was elected in 2016, but left the Assembly group later that year to sit as an Independent. Mark Reckless was elected in 2016, but defected to the Welsh Conservative Party in 2017. Caroline Jones resigned from the party in 2018. Several former UKIP Assembly members moved to the Brexit Party in 2019. On 7 Nov 19 Gareth Bennett became an independent member, until 24 June 2020, as he later joined the Abolish the Welsh Assembly Party, a single-issue anti-Welsh Devolution party.

No UKIP MSs were elected in the 2021 Senedd election, with the party's sole surviving MS, Neil Hamilton failing to be re-elected.

Assembly/Senedd elections

By-elections

2001–present

Source:

Northern Ireland Assembly elections

Source:

London Assembly elections
The London Assembly is elected using both first-past-the-post constituencies and a London-wide list using the D'Hondt method of proportional representation. At the 2004 election (held on the same day as elections to the European Parliament), UKIP won two of the London-wide seats, although both members subsequently defected to Veritas and contested the 2008 election as the One London party. UKIP did not have representation in the assembly again until the 2016 election in which it won two seats. Both their Assembly members, Peter Whittle and David Kurten, left the party in December 2018. UKIP lost both their seats at the 2021 election after finishing ninth on the London-wide list.

Source:

London Mayoral elections

References

UK Independence Party
Election results by party in the United Kingdom